The Daguangba Dam is a multi-purpose dam on the Changhua River in Hainan Province, China. As the primary component of the Daguangba Multipurpose Project, the dam was constructed between 1990 and 1995. It serves to provide water for both hydroelectric power generation and agriculture. It is also the largest dam and hydroelectric power station in Hainan.

Background
Preliminary construction (roads, bridges, river diversion) on the project began in March 1990. On 29 December 1993, the first generator was commissioned, with the second and third in 1994. On 29 March 1995, the fourth and last generator was commissioned. In June 1995, the concrete portion of the dam was poured to its design height. In December of that year, the entire power station was placed into commercial operation. In November 1996, the reservoir was full. Approximately 23,800 people were relocated because of either the reservoir or irrigation works. Of the project's US$197.5 million cost, US$67 million was funded by the World Bank.

Design
The Daguangba Dam consists of a concrete gravity section flanked by two homogeneous earth-fill embankment dam sections. It is the largest dam in Hainan Province.
Of that volume,  is active (or "useful") volume. The spillway is located on the gravity section and is controlled by 16 radial gates. The dam's power station is located on the right side of the gravity section and contains four 60 MW Francis turbine-generators for a total installed capacity of 240 MW. It is the largest hydroelectric power station in Hainan.

See also

Gezhen Dam – located downstream
List of major power stations in Hainan
List of dams and reservoirs in China

References

Dams in China
Hydroelectric power stations in Hainan
Dams completed in 1995
Roller-compacted concrete dams
Energy infrastructure completed in 1995
1995 establishments in China